Florida Council on Arts and Culture is a 15-member advisory council appointed to advise the Florida Secretary of State regarding cultural grant funding and on matters pertaining to culture in Florida including appointments to the Florida Artists Hall of Fame.

Appointments are determined by the Governor of Florida, President of the Florida Senate and Speaker of the Florida House in consultation with the Florida Secretary of State. The Governor manages seven seats that serve four-year terms. The President and Speaker manage four seats each, with terms of two years. According to the council's website: "The appointments are based on geographic representation, as well as demonstrated history of community service in the arts and culture."

The current members of the Florida Council on Arts and Culture are:

References

Florida culture